Yan An may refer to:

Yan'an, a city in Shaanxi, China
Yan An (table tennis) (born 1993), Chinese table tennis player
Yan An (son of Luzhong)